Princess Inés of Bourbon-Two Sicilies, Duchess of Syracuse, GE (born 18 February 1940) is a Spanish princess, the youngest child of Infante Alfonso, heir to the throne of the Two Sicilies, and Infanta Alicia.

In 1978, she became the first member of the Spanish royal family to go through legal divorce, after gaining permission from her cousin King Juan Carlos I and Pope John Paul II.

Princess Inés was, at the time of her birth, 9th in line of succession to the Spanish throne.

Early life
The last of three children and the second daughter of Infante Alfonso de Borbón-Dos Sicilias y de Borbón (1901–1964) and Princess Alicia of Bourbon-Parma (1917–2017), she was born during her parents' exile from republican Spain in Lausanne, Switzerland. Her father was the nephew of King Alfonso XIII of Spain.

Family
Inés lived in Madrid with her family, and also spent time at her parents' finca, "La Toledana", a major hunting estate in Retuerta del Bullaque.

Marriage

Princess Inés was forbidden marriage with Luis de Morales y Aguado, a Spaniard who was a commoner.

After the death of her father in 1964, and with persistence, she eventually married, in a ceremony that took place in San Jeronimo del Real, 30 January 1965. In the media, she was referred to as "the last great-grandchild of Alfonso XII of Spain". Both her cousin Prince Juan Carlos and his wife Princess Sofía attended, as well as the most distinguished Gotha of Europe.

Issue
The couple had five children.

Honours

 : Dame Grand Cross of the Sacred Military Constantinian Order of Saint George

Heraldry

Ancestry

See also
List of current Grandees of Spain

References

External links
THE HEAD OF THE ROYAL HOUSE – official website of the Royal House of Bourbon-Two Sicilies (Spanish branch)

1940 births
People from Lausanne
Princes of Bourbon-Two Sicilies
Pretenders to the throne of the Kingdom of the Two Sicilies
Swiss Roman Catholics
Spanish Roman Catholics
20th-century Roman Catholics
21st-century Roman Catholics
Living people